Stańków  is a village in the administrative district of Gmina Chełm, within Chełm County, Lublin Voivodeship, in eastern Poland. Stańków used to be the family seat of the  Hutten-Czapski family.

References

Villages in Chełm County